Popeye Village, also known as Sweethaven Village, is a purpose-built film set village that has been converted into a small attraction fun park, consisting of a collection of rustic and ramshackle wooden buildings. It is located at Prajjet Bay/Anchor Bay,  from the village core of Mellieħa, Malta.

It was built as a film set for the production of the 1980 live-action musical feature film Popeye, produced by Paramount Pictures and Walt Disney Productions starring Robin Williams and Shelley Duvall. It is open to the public as an open-air museum and seaside resort.

History
The construction of the film set began in June 1979. A construction crew of 165 working over seven months was needed to build the village, which consists of nineteen wooden buildings. Hundreds of logs and several thousand wooden planks were imported from the Netherlands, while wood shingles used in the construction of the roof tops were imported from Canada. Eight tons of nails and 2.5 cubic metres (2,000 US gal) of paint were also used in construction.

In addition, a  breakwater was built around Anchor Bay's mouth to protect the set from high seas during the filming.

The set was completed in seven months, and filming commenced on January 23, 1980 and wrapped later that year on June 19. The film, based on the comic strips by E. C. Segar, is set around the fictional village of Sweethaven, where Popeye the sailor arrives in an attempt to find his long-lost father.

Although the film had mixed reviews, Popeye Village remains a popular tourist attraction.

Attractions
Popeye Village is open to the public seven days a week and, apart from the film set itself, has a number of family attractions for the visitor to experience. There are shows, rides and museums, as well as play houses where children can climb and explore the village. Children can meet the main characters from the show such as Popeye, Olive Oyl, Bluto and Wimpy.

Set dressings and props
Some of the houses in Popeye Village have been equipped with various items related to the filming, including props used in the film's production.

Cinema
Situated in the centre of Popeye Village's Lower Complex, visitors can see a 15-minute history and information audio-visual show which includes clips from the actual film and the set's construction. The cinema can accommodate approximately 40 people and has a show every hour. 

Popeye Village hosts a variety of functions and activities at certain times of the year, including casual barbecue lunches and dinners.

Shows
Performers and animators provide regular entertainment for families while they are visiting the village, and many of these shows interact with the audience. They include:

 Puppet Show. Featuring five Popeye characters and the Puppet Master, the story is fully interactive with the children in the audience.
 Figaro. The barber of Sweethaven creates his miraculous and artistic hairstyles whilst singing happily to classical music.
 Jerry Sprinjer Show. This performance investigates an old secret that has been lurking in Sweethaven. Two "bodyguards" are chosen, and the audience has a chance to ask questions to discover the story's conclusion.
 Popeye and his Friends. A play featuring some famous and not so famous singers, each dance has been choreographed with attention to detail. It is this show where all the Popeye characters gather on stage to sing the Popeye theme song.
 Doctor Graves. Doctor Graves picks a member of the audience to try his experiment on. The audience member is sent to Hollywood.

Cyclone Helios storm damage 
On February 9 2023 the torrential rain inflicted on Malta by Cyclone Helios caused a large boulder to become dislodged from a cliff overlooking Popeye Village, causing significant damage to at least one of the film set structures. There were no reported casualties as the attraction had been closed due to the storm. It remains closed while the extent of the damage is assessed and repairs are carried out to prevent further danger.

See also
 Portmeirion

References

External links

 Official website
 Sweethaven Village at VisitMalta.com

Museums in Malta
Popeye
Tourist attractions in Malta
Buildings and structures completed in 1979
Mellieħa